The 1961 UCLA Bruins football team was an American football team that represented the University of California, Los Angeles (UCLA) as a member of the Athletic Association of Western Universities (AAWU) during the 1961 NCAA University Division football season. In their fourth year under head coach William F. Barnes, the Bruins compiled an overall record of 7–4 record with a mark of 3–1 in conference play, winning the AAWU title. UCLA Was invited to the Rose Bowl, where they lost to Minnesota.

UCLA's offensive leaders in 1961 were quarterbacks Bobby Smith and Mike Haffner with 327 passing yards each, Haffner with 703 rushing yards, and Kermit Alexander with 297 receiving yards.

Schedule

References

UCLA
UCLA Bruins football seasons
Pac-12 Conference football champion seasons
UCLA Bruins football
UCLA Bruins football